Mianwo is a deep-fried, donut-shaped snack from Wuhan in Hubei province in central China. It is made from soy milk, rice milk, flour, sesame, and chopped Chinese scallion. Mianwo usually has a salty taste, but a sweeter variant may be made with diced sweet potato.

The origin of Mianwo is uncertain, but tradition dates it back to the Guangxu era of the Qing Dynasty (1875–1909). A local sesame cake maker, Chang Ziren, supposedly created the first Mianwo while experimenting with novel seed cake varieties in Hankou.

See also

Hubei cuisine

References

Chinese cuisine
Chinese doughnuts
Hubei cuisine
Deep fried foods